The 1944 Kansas Jayhawks football team represented the University of Kansas in the Big Six Conference during the 1944 college football season. In their second season under head coach Henry Shenk, the Jayhawks compiled a 3–6–1 record (1–4 against conference opponents), tied for last place in the Big Six, and were outscored by opponents by a combined total of 153 to 128. They played their home games at Memorial Stadium in Lawrence, Kansas.

The team's statistical leaders included Charlie Moffatt with 300 rushing yards, 222 passing yards, and 43 points scored (seven touchdowns and one extra point), and Dwight Sutherland with 148 receiving yards. Warren Riegle was the team captain.

Schedule

References

Kansas
Kansas Jayhawks football seasons
Kansas Jayhawks football